Košťálov is a municipality and village in Semily District in the Liberec Region of the Czech Republic. It has about 1,600 inhabitants.

Administrative parts
Villages of Čikvásky, Kundratice and Valdice are administrative parts of Košťálov.

References

Villages in Semily District